The Only Fun in Town is a studio album by the indie Scottish post-punk band Josef K. It was recorded in Brussels and released in 1981 on Postcard Records, being the only album issued by the original iteration of that label.

Track listing

Side A

Side B

References

External links 
 The Only Fun in Town at Discogs

1981 debut albums
Josef K (band) albums